The Parties may refer to:

 The Parties (band)
 "The Parties", an episode of That's So Raven
 Protected Area Run Time Interface Extension Services (PARTIES), a BIOS interface to access reserved areas on harddisks